A cornerstone is a ceremonial masonry stone set in a prominent location on the outside of a building.

Cornerstone may also refer to:

Companies and organizations 
Cornerstone (agency), a New York-based creative agency
Cornerstone, an imprint of Random House UK
Cornerstone (charity), a Scottish charity providing support and care for people with disabilities
Cornerstone OnDemand Inc., an American cloud-based talent management software company
Cornerstone Policy Research and its legislative action arm Cornerstone-Action, a U.S. political organization based in the state of New Hampshire
Cornerstone Research, an economic and financial consulting firm in the United States
Cornerstone Theater Company, a Los Angeles–based theater company 
Cornerstones F.C., a Ghanaian football club
Cornerstone Church (disambiguation)
Cornerstone Barristers

Music 
 Cornerstone (Austrian Band), AOR-group 
 Cornerstone, Danish hard rock group formed by Doogie White
Cornerstone Festival, an annual Christian rock and alternative music festival

Albums and EPs
Cornerstone (Styx album), 1979
Cornerstone (Holly Dunn album), 1987
Cornerstone (Hillsong Worship album), a 2012 album by Hillsong
Cornerstone EP, 2012 live EP by Hillsong Church
Cornerstone EP, 2013 EP by Benjamin Clementine, or its title track
Cornerstone (Richard X. Heyman album), 1998

Songs
"Cornerstone" (song), the second single from the Arctic Monkeys' third album Humbug

Religion 
Cornerstone (magazine), a magazine published by Jesus People USA in Chicago, Illinois, USA from 1971 to 2003
Cornerstone Church (disambiguation)
Cornerstone Community, an Australian Christian training and mission movement
Cornerstone Television, a religious television network in the United States

Schools 
Cornerstone Christian Academy (Bloomington, Illinois), Bloomington, Illinois
Cornerstone Christian Academy (Ohio), Willoughby, Ohio
Cornerstone University, a Christian university in Grand Rapids, MI

Other 
 Cornerstone (software), a relational database program released by Infocom in 1985
 Cornerstone Group, a grouping of socially-conservative Members of Parliament within the British Conservative Party

See also
Foundation Stone in Jerusalem
Dedication Stone, an Aztec monument